Lebanon station may refer to:

Lebanon station (Tennessee) a Music City Star train station in Lebanon, Tennessee
Lebanon (NJT station), a New Jersey Transit station in Lebanon, New Jersey
Lebanon station (Pennsylvania Railroad), a former Pennsylvania Railroad train station in Lebanon, Pennsylvania 
Lebanon station (Reading Railroad), a former Reading Railroad station in Lebanon, Pennsylvania 
Mt. Lebanon (PAT station), a Pittsburgh Light Rail station in Mt. Lebanon, Pennsylvania